In Jun-yeon (born 12 March 1991) is a South Korean footballer who plays as a midfielder  for K3 League side Pocheon Citizen FC.

External links 

1991 births
Living people
Association football midfielders
South Korean footballers
Gyeongnam FC players
Daegu FC players
Chungju Hummel FC players
Goyang Zaicro FC players
Korea National League players
K League 1 players
K League 2 players